872 Holda is a minor planet orbiting the Sun.

The asteroid is named after Edward Singleton Holden, an American astronomer.

References

External links
 
 

000872
Discoveries by Max Wolf
Named minor planets
000872
000872
19170521